Transmission function can refer to
transfer function
propagation constant